Glencross ("Railroad Village") is an unincorporated community in Dewey County in the U.S. state of South Dakota. It is located within the Cheyenne River Indian Reservation.

History
Glencross was founded in 1919 by Conrad Mattern, who, along with his brother Frederick Louis Mattern, owned and operated the first store in the town. The town's name reportedly comes from its location where two valleys, or glens, intersect.

Notable person
Elmer Diedtrich, South Dakota politician

References

Unincorporated communities in Dewey County, South Dakota
Unincorporated communities in South Dakota